Deutsch-Polnische Gesellschaft Bundesverband (DPG) is a society of different regional associations which promote reconciliation and cultural exchange of Germany and Poland. It was founded in 1996, succeeding the Bundesverband deutsch-polnischer Gesellschaften, which was founded in 1987. One of the goals is the integration of Poland in die European Union. The organization is based in Berlin.

The association publishes a quarterly bilingual magazine, .

Beginning in 2005, the association has awarded an annually a prize, also called DIALOG, to persons and organisations that are "a model for the dielogue of nations and cultures in Europe, and the improvement of German-Polish relations" ("... in vorbildlicher Art und Weise für den Dialog der Völker und Kulturen in Europa sowie die Vertiefung der deutsch-polnischen Beziehungen engagieren").

Recipients have included:
 2005: Tygodnik Powszechny, Kraków weekly
 2006: Pogranicze, foundation in Sejny
 2007: 
 2008: Steffen Möller, writer and cabaretist
 2009: Ludwig Mehlhorn, Wolfgang Templin
 2010: , historian, and Kowalski trifft Schmidt, TV
 2011: Institut für angewandte Geschichte, in Frankfurt (Oder)
 2012: , writer
 2013: Grażyna Słomka, Adam Krzemiński, publicists
 2014: Lech Wałęsa and the Interregionaler Gewerkschaftsrat Elbe-Neiße
 2015: Zofia Posmysz, writer, and 
 2016: Marek Prawda, diplomat
 2017: , journalist and literature translator

References

External links 
 

Clubs and societies in Germany
Germany–Poland relations
1996 establishments in Europe